Miller's Ale House is a Florida-based American restaurant and sports bar chain which serves steaks, chicken, burgers, salads, seafood, and similar items. Though most of their locations are in Florida, there are a number of restaurants now open in Georgia, Illinois, Maryland, New Jersey, New York, Pennsylvania, Delaware, Virginia, and Tennessee. 

Locations are generally named after the town or neighborhood in which the store is located; for example, Miller's Ale House - Davie in Davie, Florida, or Miller's Ale House - Levittown in Levittown, New York. The use of the name "Miller's" in the name is recent; in the past each restaurant was named for its location. For instance, the signage for the location in Gainesville, Florida, was Gainesville Ale House, the location in Ocala, Florida, was called Ocala Ale House and the multiple locations around Orlando, Florida, were all called Orlando Ale House. There are 55 locations in Florida, eight in Pennsylvania, seven in Illinois, six in New York, four in New Jersey, three in Tennessee and Maryland, two each in Georgia, and Ohio, and one each in Delaware, and Virginia.

History
The first Ale House opened in 1988 in Jupiter, Florida.

In 2003, Nation's Restaurant News reported on Miller's Ale House's rapid expansion in the early 2000s, as well as on the chain's "high-grossing" revenues. According to the publication, average units of the restaurant grossed $4.1 million annually, and the chain's overall revenue for 2002 exceeded $125 million.

References

External links 
 

Restaurants in Florida
Restaurants established in 1988
Restaurant chains in the United States
Companies based in Orlando, Florida